The British Handball Association is the governing body of Team Handball in Britain. It has been a member of the International Handball Federation (IHF) since 1970 and of the European Handball Federation (EHF) (for IHF matters). It has 864.683 members as of 2014. Other representation at European level is under different national associations: the England Handball Association and the Scottish Handball Association. This dual structure, which is shared by several others sports, reflects the conflict between the desire of the home nations to organise the sport separately, and the need to have an overall body for international purposes, such as the Olympics.

History
The British Handball Association was founded in Liverpool in 1967 by four Liverpool teachers Phil Holden, Chris Powell, Jeff Rowland and Andy Smith. In 1968 the Association was accepted as a member of the International Handball Federation. Prior to this the IHF had recognised the Hull Handball League which existed between 1958 and 1962

British Cup
The British Cup was a knock-out competition for British Handball Clubs.

Results (Men) 

 Data sources: 1977-1982; 1983; 1986 & 1998; 1987, 1996, 1999 & 2000; 2005 British Handball Association; 2006 London GD; 2004 & 2007 Great Dane Handball Club Club Achievements.

National Teams

Results Men (Senior)

Data Sources 1959 & 1960  1969 ; 1976 ; 2008

Results Men (Under 21)

References

External links
 Official website
 Handball blog

Great Britain
Handball in the United Kingdom
Organisations based in Lancashire
Sports organizations established in 1967
Sport in the Borough of Rossendale
Handball